Provincial Highway 86 is an expressway, which begins in South District, Tainan on Provincial Highway No. 17 and ends in Guanmiao District, Tainan on National Highway No. 3 in Taiwan.

Length
The total length is 20 km.

Exit List
The entire route is within Tainan City.

{| class="plainrowheaders wikitable"
|-
!scope=col|City
!scope=col|Location
!scope=col|km
!scope=col|Mile
!scope=col|Exit
!scope=col|Name
!scope=col|Destinations
!scope=col|Notes
|-

Major Cities Along the Route
Tainan City

Intersections with other Freeways and Expressways
National Highway No. 1 at Rende JCT. in Rende, Tainan
National Highway No. 3 at Guanmiao IC. in Guanmiao, Tainan

See also
 Highway system in Taiwan

Notes
The highway has been completed as of December 15, 2013.

References

http://www.thb.gov.tw/

Highways in Taiwan